Rangpur Cantonment is a cantonment located in Rangpur, Bangladesh. It is the headquarter of 66th Infantry Division of Bangladesh Army.

History
The mass of the city of Rangpur were protesting against the Pakistanis from a very beginning of the year 1971. Consequently, some revolutionaries including one teenager laid down their lives on the streets of Rangpur. This was even referred in famous 7 March Speech of Bangabandhu. But within mid-March the Pakistanis themselves became cornered in the city as the youth of Rangpur had already started attacking them. In such an event one youngman named "Shahed" attacked a lieutenant of Pakistan army, tackled him and 3 of his subordinate troops alone and bare handedly and then obtained their arms.

In the night of 25th March when the Pakistan army launched infamous Operation Searchlight, the Pakistani troops in Rangpur started disarmed Bengali guards at Rangpur cantonment, then each Bengali patrol group was surrounded by waiting Pakistani soldiers on their return from regular patrolling and disarmed. Bengali officers and soldiers of 23rd Field and 29 cavalry were neutralised this way and most were executed. Pakistani troops moved into Rangpur on 25 March around 12:00 am and took up positions around the city. A Bengali officer captain Nawajesh had barely escaped from the EPR HQ with some men, but the Pakistanis neutralised the police and remaining EPR troops easily.

In 28th of March one significant event took place in Rangpur cantonment. The Bangali mass of Rangpur City along with a huge number of tribal Santali fighters launched a pre-emptive attack on the cantonment with local arms like spears and poisonous arrows. Showing extraordinary understanding of military strategies and valour they flanked the Pakistani defences adjacent to the cantonment almost undetected  and attacked them from a very unexpected and unprotected direction. They in the way of penetrating the Pakistani defence column suddenly came under heavy machine-gun fires and in it many Bengalis an Santalis laid down their lives. Although failed initially, this attack downed the morale of the Pakistani troops and they in retaliation started taking revenge on the corpses of the martyres by burning those with patrols, executing existing Bengali troops of Pakistan army inside the cantonment, raping their wives and torturing other family members and civilians stranded in the nearby Rangpur Central Jail.

This cantonment was freed by Mukti Bahini troops in the month of November within just one month after the death of famous freedom fighter of Rangpur, Shahid Mukhtar Elahi.

Institutions
 Rangpur Cantonment Public School and College
 Rangpur Cadet College
 Rangpur Army Medical College
 Rangpur Army medical college shopping mall 
 Bir Uttam Shaheed Mahbub Senanibas
 Rangpur Golf Club
 The Millennium Stars School & College
 Bangladesh Army University of Science and Technology

Commander of Army Security Unit Rangpur area: Lt Col Mohammad Masudur Rahaman, psc (2021-2022)

References

Cantonments of Bangladesh